Pet Sounds is the eleventh studio album by the American rock band the Beach Boys, released on May 16, 1966 by Capitol Records. It was initially met with a lukewarm critical and commercial response in the United States, peaking at number 10 on the Billboard Top LPs chart. In the United Kingdom, the album was lauded by critics and reached number 2 on the Record Retailer chart, remaining in the top ten for six months. Promoted there as "the most progressive pop album ever", Pet Sounds was recognized for its ambitious production, sophisticated music, and emotional lyrics. It is considered to be among the greatest and most influential albums in music history.

The album was produced, arranged, and almost entirely composed by Brian Wilson with guest lyricist Tony Asher. It was recorded largely between January and April 1966, a year after Wilson had quit touring with his bandmates and debuted a more progressive sound with The Beach Boys Today!. Wilson viewed Pet Sounds as effectively a solo album and credited part of its inspiration to marijuana and a newfound spiritual enlightenment. Galvanized by the work of his idol Phil Spector and rival group the Beatles, his goal was to create "the greatest rock album ever made", one without filler. An early concept album, it consists mainly of introspective and semi-autobiographical songs like "You Still Believe in Me", about a lover's unwavering loyalty, "I Know There's an Answer", a critique of LSD users, and "I Just Wasn't Made for These Times", about social alienation.

Incorporating elements of pop, jazz, exotica, classical, psychedelia, and the avant-garde, Wilson's Wall of Sound-based orchestrations mixed conventional rock set-ups with elaborate layers of vocal harmonies, found sounds, and instruments rarely if ever associated with rock, such as bicycle bells, French horn, flutes, Electro-Theremin, string sections, and beverage cans. It marked the most complex instrumental and vocal parts of any Beach Boys album, and the first in which studio musicians (such as the Wrecking Crew) replaced the band on most of the instrumental tracks. The album could not be reproduced live and was the first time that any group departed from their usual small-ensemble pop/rock band format for a whole LP. Its unprecedented total production cost exceeded $70,000 (equivalent to $ in ). Lead single "Caroline, No" was issued as Wilson's official solo debut. It was followed by two singles credited to the group: "Sloop John B" and "Wouldn't It Be Nice" (backed with "God Only Knows"). A planned successor album, Smile, was never finished.

Pet Sounds revolutionized music production and the role of professional record producers, especially through Wilson's pioneering studio-as-instrument praxis. The record contributed to the cultural legitimization of popular music, a greater public appreciation for albums, the popularity of synthesizers, and the development of psychedelic music and progressive/art rock. It also introduced novel approaches to orchestration, chord voicings, and structural harmonies; for example, most of the compositions feature a weak tonal center, rendering their key signatures ambiguous. Although it had been widely revered by industry insiders, the album was obscure to mass audiences before being reissued in the 1990s, after which it topped several critics' and musicians' polls for the best album of all time, including those published by NME, Mojo, Uncut, and The Times. In 2004, it was inducted into the National Recording Registry by the Library of Congress. Pet Sounds is certified platinum by the RIAA, indicating over one million units sold, and has ranked consistently as the highest rated album on Acclaimed Music since 2004. An expanded reissue, The Pet Sounds Sessions, was released in 1997 with isolated vocals and instrumental versions, session highlights, and the album's first true stereo mix.

Background

The July 1964 release of the Beach Boys' sixth album All Summer Long marked an end to the group's beach-themed period. From then, their recorded material took a significantly different stylistic and lyrical path. In January 1965, to focus his efforts on writing and recording, 22-year-old Brian Wilson declared to his bandmates that he would not accompany them on concert tours. The rest of the group – Brian's brothers Carl and Dennis, their cousin Mike Love, and their friend Al Jardine – continued to tour without Wilson, who was replaced on the road by Bruce Johnston of Bruce & Terry.

Wilson immediately showcased great advances in his musical development with the 1965 albums The Beach Boys Today! and Summer Days (And Summer Nights!!). Released in March, Today! signaled a departure from the Beach Boys' previous records with its orchestral approach, intimate subject matter, and abandonment of themes related to surfing, cars, or superficial expressions of love. Wilson also directed his new lyrical approach toward the autobiographical, with his songs written from the perspective of vulnerable, neurotic, and insecure narrators. Summer Days followed three months later and represented a bridge between Wilson's progressive musical conceptions and the group's traditional pre-1965 approach.

On July 12, Wilson recorded a backing track for "Sloop John B", but after laying down a rough lead vocal, he set the song aside for some time, concentrating on the recording of what became their next LP, the informal studio jam Beach Boys' Party!, in response to their record company Capitol's request for a Beach Boys album for the Christmas 1965 market. In October, Wilson and his wife, 17-year-old singer Marilyn Rovell, moved from a rented apartment in West Hollywood to a home on Laurel Way in Beverly Hills, where he said he spent the subsequent months contemplating "the new direction of the group".

Wilson devoted the last three months of 1965 to polishing the vocals of "Sloop John B" and recording six new original compositions. "The Little Girl I Once Knew", released as a standalone single in November, was the last original Beach Boys song issued before any Pet Sounds tracks. In December, Capitol issued the Party! track "Barbara Ann" as a single without the group's knowledge or approval. Brian expressed to reporters that the song was not a "produced" record and should not be considered indicative of the group's upcoming music. From January 7 to 29, the rest of the band went away on a concert tour of Japan and Hawaii.

Writing sessions

While at a recording studio in Los Angeles in 1965, Wilson met Tony Asher, a 26-year-old lyricist and copywriter working in jingles for an advertising agency. The two exchanged ideas for songs, and soon after, Wilson heard of Asher's writing abilities from mutual friend Loren Schwartz. In December, Wilson contacted Asher about a possible lyric collaboration, wanting to do something "completely different" with someone he had never written with before. Asher accepted the offer, and within ten days, they were writing together, starting with "You Still Believe in Me".

Wilson and Asher wrote together over a two-to-three week period at Wilson's home, likely between January and February 1966. A typical writing session started either with Wilson playing a melody or chord patterns that he was working on, by discussing a recent record that Wilson liked the feel of, or by discussing a subject that Wilson had always wanted to write a song about. They referred to their rough musical sketches as "feels", per the vernacular of the time. To inspire creativity, they sometimes smoked marijuana together. The lyrics to their songs were finished before the recording of any backing tracks (except for "You Still Believe in Me") and recording started virtually as soon as the compositions were written.

Asher maintained that he served mainly as a source of second opinion for Wilson as he worked out possible melodies and chord progressions, although the two did trade ideas as the songs evolved. On his role as co-lyricist, he said, "The general tenor of the lyrics was always his [...] and the actual choice of words was usually mine. I was really just his interpreter." Asher later stated that he made some significant musical contributions to "I Just Wasn't Made for These Times", "Caroline, No", and "That's Not Me".

In Marilyn's recollection, Brian worked on Pet Sounds virtually nonstop, and that when he was home, "he was either at the piano, arranging, or eating." Asher differed, "I wish I could say Brian was totally committed [to writing the songs]. Let's say he was ... um, very concerned." After their songs were completed, Asher visited a few of the recording sessions, most of which were string overdub dates.

Wilson wrote two more songs with other collaborators. "I Know There's an Answer", which predated the collaboration with Asher, was co-written by Wilson with the Beach Boys' road manager Terry Sachen.  In 1994, Mike Love was awarded co-writing credits on "Wouldn't It Be Nice" and "I Know There's an Answer", but with the exception of his co-credit on "I'm Waiting for the Day", his songwriting contributions are thought to have been minimal.

Concept and inspiration

Phil Spector and Rubber Soul

Commentators and historians frequently cite Pet Sounds as a concept album. Academic Carys Wyn Jones attributes this to the album's "uniform excellence" rather than a lyrical theme or musical motif. Wilson described Pet Sounds as an "interpretation" of Phil Spector's Wall of Sound production technique. He stated: "If you take the Pet Sounds album as a collection of art pieces, each designed to stand alone, yet which belong together, you'll see what I was aiming at. [...] It wasn't really a song concept album, or lyrically a concept album; it was really a production concept album."

With Pet Sounds, Wilson desired to make "a complete statement", similar to what he believed the Beatles had done with their newest album Rubber Soul, released in December 1965. The version of the album that he heard was the alternate American edition, whose track listing had been configured by Capitol to have a cohesive folk rock sound. Wilson was impressed that the album appeared to lack filler, a feature that was mostly unheard of at a time when more attention was afforded to 45 rpm singles than to full-length LPs. Most albums up until the mid-1960s were largely used to sell singles at a higher price point. Wilson found that Rubber Soul subverted this by having a wholly consistent thread of music. Inspired, he rushed to his wife and proclaimed, "Marilyn, I'm gonna make the greatest album! The greatest rock album ever made!"

Comparing Pet Sounds to Rubber Soul, author Michael Zager wrote that Pet Sounds has more in common with Spector's productions, and that the album recycles many of Spector's Wall of Sound production watermarks. Wilson said that he was especially fascinated by the process of combining sounds "to make another", and for Pet Sounds, sought to emulate those aspects of Spector's productions. In a 1988 interview, Wilson said that his goal for the album was to "extend" Spector's music, as he believed that, "in one sense of the word", the Beach Boys were Spector's "messengers".

On another occasion, Wilson credited Rubber Soul as his "main motivator" for Pet Sounds. He explained that he had wanted to create music "on the same level" as Rubber Soul, but was not interested in copying the Beatles' sound. In a 1966 interview, he said that the scale of the arrangements was the "main difference" between their musical styles, noting that if he had arranged the Rubber Soul track "Norwegian Wood", he would have "orchestrated it, put in background voices, [and] done a thousand things". In 2009, he said that although "Rubber Soul didn't clarify my ideas for Pet Sounds", the Beatles' use of sitar had inspired his choice of instrumentation for the album.

Spirituality, drugs, and marital issues

Spirituality was another core inspiration for the album. Asked about Pet Sounds in various interviews, Wilson frequently emphasized the album's spiritual qualities, saying that he had held prayer sessions with his brother Carl and "kind of made [the recording sessions into] a religious ceremony." In a 1995 interview, he stated, "We prayed for an album that would be a rival to Rubber Soul. It was like a prayer, but there was some ego there... and it worked."

During his first LSD trip in April 1965, Wilson had what he considered to be "a very religious experience" and claimed to have seen God. He soon began suffering from auditory hallucinations and, for the remainder of the year, experienced considerable paranoia. Wilson believed that LSD influenced the writing of Pet Sounds because it "brought out some of the insecurities in me, which I think went into the music." He also attributed his greater sense of creative freedom to his use of marijuana.

Much of the album's pessimistic and dejected lyric content was inspired by Wilson's marital struggles, which had been exacerbated by his drug habits in particular. Marilyn felt that their relationship was a central reference within the album's lyrics, namely on "You Still Believe in Me" and "Caroline, No". According to Asher, he and Wilson had many lengthy, intimate discussions centered around their "experiences and feelings about women and the various stages of relationships and so forth" in order to inspire subject matter for their songs. This included Wilson's doubts about his marriage, "[his] sexual fantasies", and "his apparent need to get with [his sister-in-law] Diane."

Pre-rock 'n' roll pop and other influences

Asher disputed the notion that he and Wilson were following the models that had been set by Beatles or rock music in general. Asher remembered, "Brian had defined it as wanting to write something closer to classical American love songs, like Cole Porter or Rodgers and Hammerstein." During the writing sessions, Asher and Wilson regularly introduced different albums and types of music to each other. In particular, Asher said that Wilson "was blown away" after being played jazz records including Duke Ellington's "Sophisticated Lady" and Lionel Hampton's rendition of "All the Things You Are". He remembered that Wilson had minimal awareness of Tin Pan Alley songs and "hadn't given much thought to the structure or instrumentation of orchestral jazz compositions." Having had experience with recording orchestras, Asher encouraged Wilson to employ instruments such as violins, cellos, and bass flutes.

In a March 1966 article, Wilson acknowledged that the popular music trends of the era had also influenced his work and the group's evolution. Conversely, Marilyn recalled that Brian was only consumed by thoughts of creating the greatest rock album ever and "did not think about what music was there on the market, or what was happening in the industry." In a 1996 interview, he said that he and Asher were "kind of like on our own little wavelength" and were not concerned with overtaking Phil Spector or Motown, "It was more what I would call exclusive collaboration not to specifically try to kick somebody's butt, but just to do it the way you really want it to be. That's what I thought we did."

Genres

Stylistic blend and debate
Pet Sounds incorporates elements of pop, jazz, classical, exotica, and avant-garde music. Genres that have been attributed to the album as a whole include progressive pop, chamber pop, psychedelic pop, and art rock. Wilson himself thought of the album as "chapel rock [...] commercial choir music. I wanted to make an album that would stand up in ten years."

According to biographer Jon Stebbins, "Brian defies any notion of genre safety [...] There isn't much rocking here, and even less rolling. Pet Sounds is at times futuristic, progressive, and experimental. [...] there's no boogie, no woogie, and the only blues are in the themes and in Brian's voice." Bruce Johnston identified "a tremendous amount" of noticeable doo-wop and R&B influences. Journalist D. Strauss challenged the notion of whether Pet Sounds should be regarded as rock music. He argued that the album's quality and subversion of rock traditions is "what created its special place in rock history; there was no category for its fans to place it in [...] But placed within the Easy Listening genre-i.e., elevator music-it becomes a historically grounded, if incredibly ambitious, release."

Although it has been called "baroque pop", the often-specious term was not used in critical discussions about Pet Sounds until rock critics in the 1990s began adopting the phrase in reference to artists that the album had influenced. No contemporary press material referred to Pet Sounds as "baroque", and instead, commentators used "progressive" as their descriptor of choice. Writing in 2021, academic John Howland argued that the album's baroque-pop aesthetic was limited to "God Only Knows".

Psychedelia
{{listen
| filename     = I Know There's an Answer.ogg
| title        = "I Know There's an Answer" sections
| description  = ''Consequences Zach Ruskin expressed: "while Pet Sounds offers an intimacy unlike other psychedelic pop of the time, soundscapes of whispers and reverb and sudden departures in structure and form do lend the record a somewhat trippy effect."
}}

Pet Sounds is often considered to be psychedelic rock, but many commentators hesitate to name the Beach Boys in discussions of psychedelic music. For example, in his book The Acid Trip: A Complete Guide to Psychedelic Music, Vernon Joyson agreed that Pet Sounds contained psychedelic gestures, but chose not to devote significant coverage to the album because he felt that the Beach Boys had "essentially predated the psychedelic era". In the belief of cultural historian Dale Carter, the album's psychedelic qualities are proven through rich "sonic textures", "greater fluidity, elaboration, and formal complexity", "the introduction of new (combinations of) instruments, multiple keys, and/or floating tonal centers", and the occasional use of "slower, more hypnotic tempos".

According to academics Paul Hegarty and Martin Halliwell, Pet Sounds has a "personal intimacy" that sets it apart from the Beach Boys' contemporaries in psychedelic culture and the San Francisco Sound, but still retains a "trippy feel" that resulted from Wilson's LSD use.  They attribute this to Wilson's "eclectic mixture of instruments, echo, reverb, and innovative mixing techniques learnt from Phil Spector to create a complex soundscape in which voice and music interweave tightly". Stebbins writes that the album is "slightly psychedelic—or at least impressionistic." Wilson himself felt that while psychedelic features are present in a number of the songs, the overall tone was "mostly not psychedelic".

Among other reasons given for the album's perceived psychedelic quality, Jim DeRogatis, author of a book about psychedelic music, writes that the repeated listening value is similar to a heightened psychedelic awareness, elaborating that its melodies "continue to reveal themselves after dozens of listens, just as previously unnoticed corners of the world reveal themselves during the psychedelic experience". Musician Sean Lennon opined that "psychedelic music is a term that pretty much refers to these sort of epic, ambitious long-form records [...] the reason Pet Sounds is considered a psychedelic journey or whatever is because it's like opening a door and stepping through and entering another world and you're in that other world for a period of time and then you come back."

Music and lyrics
Orchestrations and composition

Pet Sounds refined the themes and complex arranging style Wilson had introduced with The Beach Boys Today!. Writing in The Journal on the Art of Record Production, Marshall Heiser observed that the album's music distinguished itself from previous Beach Boys releases in several ways:
 "a greater sense of depth and 'warmth'"
 "more inventive use of harmony and chord voicings"
 "the prominent use of percussion [as] a key feature (as opposed to driving drum backbeats)"
 "the orchestrations, [which] at times, echo the quirkiness of 'exotica' bandleader Les Baxter, or the 'cool' of Burt Bacharach, more so than [Phil] Spector's teen fanfares."

By contrast, musicologist Daniel Harrison contends that Wilson's advancement as a composer and arranger was marginal in relation to his past work. He wrote that Pet Sounds shows "comparatively little advance from what Brian had already accomplished or shown himself capable of accomplishing. Most of the songs use unusual harmonic progressions and unexpected disruptions of hypermeter, both features that were met in 'Warmth of the Sun' and 'Don't Back Down.'" Granata referred to Pet Sounds as the culmination of Wilson's songwriting artistry, although his "transition from writing car and surf songs to writing studious ones" had already "exploded in 1965".

Pet Sounds includes tempo changes, metrical ambiguity, and unusual tone colors that, in the opinion of author James Perone, remove the album from "just about anything else that was going on in 1966 pop music". He cites the album's closer "Caroline, No" and its use of wide tessitura changes, wide melodic intervals, and instrumentation which contribute to this belief; also Wilson's compositions and orchestral arrangements which experiment with form and tone colors. Wilson's arrangements combined traditional rock set-ups with unconventional selections of instruments and complex layers of vocal harmonies. His orchestrations, in terms of the choices of instruments themselves and the stylistic appropriation of foreign cultures, were similar to those by exotica producers such as Martin Denny, Les Baxter, and Esquivel. Many of the instruments were alien to rock music, including glockenspiel, ukulele, accordion, Electro-Theremin, bongos, harpsichord, violin, viola, cello, trombone, Coca-Cola bottles, and other odd sounds such as bicycle bells.

The number of unique instruments for each track average to about a dozen. Electric and acoustic basses were frequently doubled, as was typical for the era's pop music, and played with a plectrum. Drums were not arranged in a traditional manner of keeping time, but instead, to provide "rhythmic texture and color". Two tracks are instrumentals: "Let's Go Away for Awhile" and "Pet Sounds". They were originally recorded as backing tracks for existing songs, but by the time the album neared completion, Wilson decided that the tracks worked better without vocals. Arranger Paul Mertens, who collaborated with Wilson on live performances of the album, believed that although there are string sections on Pet Sounds, "what's special about that is not that Brian was trying to introduce classical music into rock & roll. Rather, he was trying to get classical musicians to play like rock musicians. He's using these things to make music in the way that he understood, rather than trying to appropriate the orchestra."

 Structures and harmonies 

Musicologist Philip Lambert estimates that the album's "overall unity" is strengthened by "strong musical relationships among songs", for example, the use of 4–3–2–1 stepwise descents and the reverse. Perone concurred that the album contains musical continuity. On "You Still Believe in Me", he references a "stepwise falloff of the interval of a third at the end of each verse" as a typically "Wilsonian" feature that recurs throughout the album, along with a "madrigal sigh motif" that can be heard in "That's Not Me", where the motif concludes each line of the verses.

Wilson tended to write vertically, in block chords, rather than in the horizontal manner of classical composition. An overwhelming majority of the chords are slashed, diminished, major seventh, sixths, ninths, augmented, or suspended. Simple (major or minor triad) chords are invoked minimally. The bass lines were written melodically and tend to play parts that avoid focusing on tonic notes. According to Lambert, one of the album's few recurring compositional features that did not reflect a recent trend in Wilson's songwriting were bass lines that descend from 1 to 5.

Only four tracks feature a single strongly established key. The rest feature a primary and secondary key or a weak tonal center. Tertian key modulations feature throughout the album and many of the choices of key signatures in themselves were unusual.  For example, "You Still Believe in Me" is in B, which keyboardists avoid due to the number of sharps/flats, while "That's Not Me" is in F, the most distant key from C. Submediants, major or minor, are invoked in a manner that Lambert calls "an important source of overall unity". With the exception of "God Only Knows", every composition on the album that shifts keys or has an ambiguous tonal center "uses essentially the same tonic–submediant relation." Fusilli offered that Wilson's tendency to "wander far from the logic of his composition only to return triumphantly to confirm the emotional intent of his work" is repeated numerous times in Pet Sounds, but never to "evoke a sense of unbridled joy" as Wilson recently had with "The Little Girl I Once Knew".

Compared to previous Beach Boys albums, Pet Sounds contains fewer vocal harmonies, but the types of vocal harmonies themselves are more complex and varied. Instead of simple "oo" harmonies, the band showed an increasing engagement in multiple vocal counterpoints. There is also a greater occurrence of doo-wop style nonsense syllables, appearing more times here than on any of their previous albums. Wilson invokes his signature falsetto seven times on the album. With the exception of Today!, this was the most he had on a Beach Boys album since 1963's Surfer Girl.

 Introspective, coming-of-age themes 

Asher stated that Wilson aspired to create a collection of songs that were relatable to adolescents. "Even though he was dealing in the most advanced score-charts and arrangements, he was still incredibly conscious of this commercial thing. This absolute need to relate." Carl Wilson offered: "The disappointment and the loss of innocence that everyone had to go through when they grow up and find everything's not Hollywood are the recurrent themes on that album."

According to AllMusic reviewer Jim Esch, the opening track "Wouldn't It Be Nice" inaugurates the album's pervasive theme of "fragile lovers" who struggle with "self-imposed romantic expectations and personal limitations, while simultaneously trying to maintain faith in one other." Comparing the group's past celebrations of adolescence and teenage romance, journalist Seth Rogovoy felt that Pet Sounds "upends and overturns every Beach Boys cliché, exposing the hollowness at their core." Rogovoy points to "Wouldn't It Be Nice", which "starts right out with a 180-degree turn – 'Wouldn't it be nice if we were older.'"

Critics Richard Goldstein and Nik Cohn found that the album's melancholic lyrics sometimes jarred with the overall tone of the music. Cohn suggested that Pet Sounds comprised "sad songs about loneliness and heartache; sad songs even about happiness." Rolling Stone editor David Wild wrote that the lyrics were "intelligent and moving, but [...] not pretentious", much like the songs of Tin Pan Alley.

 Perceived storyline 
It is sometimes suggested that Pet Sounds tells a story about the unraveling of a romantic relationship. Author Scott Schinder argued that Wilson and Asher crafted a song cycle about "the emotional challenges accompanying the transition from youth to adulthood", supplemented with "a series of intimate, hymn-like love songs". Even though Pet Sounds has a virtually unified theme in its emotional content, there was no intended narrative. Asher said that there were no conversations between him and Wilson that pertained to any specific album "concept", however, "that's not to say that [Brian] didn't have the capacity to steer it in that direction, even unconsciously." Lambert argued that Wilson must have intended the album to have a narrative framework due to the likelihood of his familiarity with similar "theme albums" by Frank Sinatra and the Four Freshmen.

Responding to the songwriters' denials of a conscious lyric theme, journalist Nick Kent observed that the album's lyrics show "the male participant's attempts at coming to terms with himself and the world about him" and that every song "pinpoints a crisis of faith in love and life" with the exception of "Sloop John B" and the two instrumental pieces. Writing in his book The Making of Pet Sounds (2003), Charles Granata referenced "Sloop John B" and "Pet Sounds" as the tracks that undermine the album's "thematic thread" and supposed lyrical narrative, yet "contribute to the marvelous pacing".

Recording
Backing tracks

With the exception of three tracks, Pet Sounds was recorded from January 18 to April 13, 1966, and spanned 27 session dates. Instrumental sessions were conducted at Western Studio 3 of United Western Recorders, except for a few tracks that were recorded at Gold Star Studios and Sunset Sound Recorders. Wilson produced the sessions with his usual engineer, Western's Chuck Britz. Although Phil Spector created all of his recordings at Gold Star, Wilson preferred working at Western for the studio's privacy and for the presence of Britz.

For the backing tracks, Wilson used an ensemble that included the classically trained session musicians frequently employed on Spector's records, a group later nicknamed "the Wrecking Crew". Wilson had been employing the services of session musicians due to the increasingly complex nature of his arrangements and because his bandmates were often away playing concerts. Carl, who had occasionally played guitar alongside these musicians at Brian's sessions, commented that his contributions were not as significant as before and that "It really wasn't appropriate for us [the band] to play on those [Pet Sounds] dates—the tracking just got beyond us."

Wilson said that he "was sort of a square" with his musicians, starting his creative process with how each instrument sounded one-by-one, moving from keyboards, drums, then violins if they were not overdubbed. A backing track session would last for three hours at minimum. Britz remembered how most of the time was spent perfecting individual sounds: "[Brian] knew basically every instrument he wanted to hear, and how he wanted to hear it. What he would do is call in all the musicians at one time (which was very costly), but still, that's the way he would do it."

Although Wilson often had entire arrangements worked out in his head, they were usually written in a shorthand form for the other players by one of his session musicians. He also took advice and suggestions from his musicians and even incorporated apparent mistakes if they provided a useful or interesting alternative.  Session drummer Hal Blaine stated, "Everyone helped arrange, as far as I'm concerned." On notation and arranging, Wilson explained: "Sometimes I'd just write out a chord sheet and that would be for piano, organ, or harpsichord or anything. [...] I wrote out all the horn charts separate from the keyboards. I wrote one basic keyboard chart, violins, horns, and basses, and percussion."

Discussing Spector's Wall of Sound technique, Wilson identified the tack piano and organ mix in "I Know There's an Answer" as one example of himself applying the method.  Compared to Spector, Brian produced tracks that were of greater technical complexity by using state-of-the-art four-track and eight-track recorders. Most backing tracks were recorded onto a Scully four-track 288 tape recorder before being later dubbed down (in mono) onto one track of an eight-track machine. Wilson typically divided instruments by three tracks: drums–percussion–keyboard, horns, and bass–additional percussion–guitar. The fourth track usually contained a rough reference mix used during playback at the session, later to be erased for overdubs such as a string section. "Once he had what he wanted," Britz said, "I would give Brian a 7-1/2 IPS [tape] copy of the track, and he would take it home."

Group infighting

Pet Sounds is sometimes considered a Brian Wilson solo album, including by Wilson himself, who later referred to it as his "first solo album" and "a chance to step outside the group and shine". With the exception of Mike Love, who had been previewed tracks over the phone by Wilson, the other members were not consulted on any aspect of the record. When they returned to the studio on February 9, they were presented with a substantial portion of the album, with music that was in many ways a jarring departure from their earlier style.

According to various reports, the group fought over the new direction. However, Dennis denied that anyone in the group had disliked Pet Sounds, calling the rumors "interesting". He said that there was "not one person in the group that could come close to Brian's talent" and "couldn't imagine who" would have resisted Brian's leadership. Carl supported that such accusations were "bullshit" before adding, "We loved that record. Everybody loved that record, it was a joy to make." Jardine differed in his recollection, "I wasn't exactly thrilled with the change [in music style], but I grew to really appreciate it as soon as we started to work on it. It wasn't like anything we'd heard before." He explained that "it took us quite a while to adjust to [the new material] because it wasn't music you could necessarily dance to—it was more like music you could make love to."

Whatever objections the band members may have had were mostly reserved for the lyrics, not the music itself. Musically, they were concerned about how they would reproduce the songs in concert. Love said that his only disagreement pertained to the lyrics of "Hang On to Your Ego", although Jardine remembered that Love was generally "very confused" about the album: "Mike's a formula hound – if it doesn't have a hook in it, if he can't hear a hook in it, he doesn't want to know about it." In defense of Love, Asher said that "[Mike] never was critical about what [the album] was, he was just saying it wasn't right for the Beach Boys." Asher said that Jardine had shared this viewpoint.

Brian recalled that the group "liked [the new music] but they said it was too arty. I said, 'No, it is not!" Marilyn said: "When Brian was writing Pet Sounds, it was difficult for the guys to understand what he was going through emotionally and what he wanted to create. [...] they didn't feel what he was going through and what direction he was trying to go in." Asher remembered: "All those guys in the band, certainly Al, Dennis, and Mike, were constantly saying, 'What the fuck do these words mean?' or 'This isn't our kind of shit!' Brian had comebacks, though. He'd say, 'Oh, you guys can't hack this.'... But I remember thinking that those were tense sessions."

Another concern among his bandmates, according to Brian, was whether he would leave the group and pursue a solo career. Brian said, "it was generally considered that the Beach Boys were the main thing [...] with Pet Sounds, there was a resistance in that I was doing most of the artistic work on it vocally". Love wrote that he "would have liked to have had a greater hand in some of the songs and been able to incorporate more often my 'lead voice,' which we'd had so much success with." Brian acknowledged that he had taken up most of the vocals "because I thought, in a way, I wanted people to know it was more of a Brian Wilson album than a Beach Boys album." He said the conflicts were resolved when his bandmates "figured that it was a showcase for Brian Wilson, but it's still the Beach Boys. In other words, they gave in. They let me have my little stint." 

Vocals

Vocal overdubs were tracked at Western and CBS Columbia Square. The Beach Boys rarely knew their parts before arriving in the studio. Britz: "Most of the time, they were never ready to sing. They would rehearse in the studio. Actually, there was no such thing as rehearsal. They'd get on mike right off the bat, practically, and start singing." According to Jardine, each member was taught their individual vocal lines by Brian at a piano. He explains, "Every night we'd come in for a playback. We'd sit around and listen to what we did the night before. Someone might say, well, that's pretty good but we can do that better." This process proved to be the most exacting work the group had undertaken yet. During recording, Mike Love often called Brian "dog ears", a nickname referencing a canine's ability to detect sounds far beyond the limits of human hearing. Love later summarized:

For microphones, they used two Neumann U-47s for Dennis, Carl and Jardine and a Shure 545 for Brian's leads. Love sang most of the album's bass vocals, and necessitated an extra microphone due to his low volume range. By the time of Pet Sounds, Wilson was using up to six of the eight tracks on the multitrack master so that he could record the voice of each member separately, allowing him greater control over the vocal balance in the final mix. After mixing down the four-track to mono for overdubbing via an eight-track recorder, six of the remaining seven tracks were usually dedicated to each of the Beach Boys' vocals. The last track was usually reserved for additional elements such as extra vocals or instrumentation. The vocals for five of the album's songs were recorded at Columbia because it was the only facility in Los Angeles with an eight-track recorder.

Effects and mixdown

Similar to subsequent experimental rock LPs by Frank Zappa, the Beatles, and the Who, Pet Sounds featured countertextural aspects that called attention to the very recordedness of the album. Tape effects were limited to slapback echo and reverb. Archivist Mark Linett notes: "to my ears, it sounds more like the plate [reverberators] rather than chambers. It should be mentioned that you get a significantly different sound from a chamber when you record it 'live' as opposed to doing it off tape, and one reason these records sound the way they do is that the reverb was being printed as part of the recording – unlike today where we'll record 'dry' and add the effects later." One of Wilson's favorite techniques was to apply reverb exclusively to a timpani, as can be heard in "Wouldn't It Be Nice", "You Still Believe in Me", and "Don't Talk".

On April 13, 1966, the album's final vocal overdubbing session, for "Here Today", concluded a ten-month-long recording period that had begun with "Sloop John B" in July 1965. The album was mixed three days later in a single nine-hour session. Most of the session was spent mixing down the vocals to fit with the instrumentals, which had already been locked into one mono track. The album's original mono master ultimately featured many technical flaws that contrast the refined arrangements and performances. One of the most prominent examples occurs in "Wouldn't It Be Nice", where an audible tape splice is heard between the chorus and Mike Love's vocal entrance in the bridge. A similar anomaly is heard in the instrumental break of "Here Today", where a distant conversation was accidentally captured during a vocal overdub. In David Leaf's view, "It's not sloppy recording, it's part of the music."

A true stereophonic mix of Pet Sounds was not considered in 1966 largely because of mixing logistics. In spite of whether a true stereo mix was possible, Wilson intentionally mixed the final version of his recordings in mono (as did Spector). He did this because he felt that mono mastering provided more sonic control over the final result, irrespective of the vagaries of speaker placement and sound system quality. Another and more personal reason for Brian's preference for mono was his almost total deafness in his right ear. At the end, the total cost of production amounted to a then-unheard of $70,000 (equivalent to $ in ).

Tracks
Side one
"Wouldn't It Be Nice"

"Wouldn't It Be Nice" describes a young couple fantasizing about the romantic freedom they would earn as adults. Asher said that it was the only song on the album in which he wrote words to a melody that Brian had already finalized. The group's vocal performance took longer to record than any other track on the album, as Wilson's bandmates struggled to sing the multiple vocal parts to his satisfaction.

"You Still Believe in Me"
"You Still Believe in Me" contains the first expression of introspective themes that pervade the rest of the album. The lyric discusses a narrator who, while acknowledging their irresponsible behavior and unfaithfulness, is impressed by the unwavering loyalty of their lover. In Wilson's words, the song was about a man who feels free to express his love for people from the perspective of a girl. Wilson and Asher created the song's ethereal intro by plucking a piano's strings with a bobby pin.

"That's Not Me"
"That's Not Me" contains multiple key modulations and mood shifts and is the track that most closely resembles a conventional rock song.  The lyric illustrates a young man in his path toward self-discovery, with the realization that he is better living with a lover than pursuing a life of solitude in service to his dream. It is the only track on the album where most of the instrumentation was played by the band members themselves.

"Don't Talk (Put Your Head on My Shoulder)"
"Don't Talk (Put Your Head on My Shoulder)" is among the most harmonically complex songs that Wilson ever wrote. The subject matter involves non-verbal communication between lovers. According to Asher, "It's strange to sit down and write a song about not talking [...] but we managed to do it".

"I'm Waiting for the Day"
"I'm Waiting for the Day" features jazz chords, a doo-wop progression, timpani blasts, English horn, flutes, and a string section interlude. Carl Wilson praised the arrangement, saying, "The intro is very big, then it gets quite small with the vocal in the verse with a little instrumentation and then, in the chorus, it gets very big again, with the background harmonies against the lead. It is perhaps one of the most dynamic moments in the album."

Lyrically, it is about a boy who falls in love with a broken-hearted girl who is reluctant to commit herself to another relationship. The song was copyrighted by Brian as a solo composition in February 1964, indicating that it predated the album's sessions by some years. It was co-credited to Love, who made a minor adjustment to Wilson's lyrics.

"Let's Go Away for Awhile"

"Let's Go Away for Awhile" is an instrumental that features 12 violins, piano, four saxophones, oboe, vibraphones, and a Coca-Cola bottle used as a guitar slide. In 1966, Wilson considered the track to be "the finest piece of art" he had made up to that point, and said that every component of its production "worked perfectly".

"Sloop John B"

At the suggestion of Al Jardine, Wilson arranged a version of "Sloop John B", a traditional Caribbean folk song that Jardine had learned from listening to the Kingston Trio. His arrangement blended rock and marching band instrumentation with the use of flutes, glockenspiel, baritone saxophone, bass, guitar, and drums. Jardine likened the result to John Philip Sousa. Wilson elected to change the original lyrics from "this is the worst trip since I've been born" to "this is the worst trip I've ever been on". This may have been done as a deliberate reference to acid trips.

Brian included "Sloop John B" on Pet Sounds to appease Capitol Records, who had expected "Sloop John B" to be a hit single and wanted to capitalize on its success by including the track on Pet Sounds. The song is often said to disrupt the album's lyrical flow, as author Jim Fusilli explains: "It's anything but a reflective love song, a stark confession or a tentative statement of independence like the other songs on the album. And it's the only song on Pet Sounds Brian didn't write."

Fusilli posits that the track fits musically with the album, citing the track's chiming guitars, doubletracked basses, and staccato rhythms.  Noting that a sense of self-doubt, concern for the future of a relationship, and melancholy pervades Pet Sounds, Perone says the song successfully portrays a sailor who feels "completely out of place in his situation", a quality that is "fully in keeping with the general feeling of disorientation that runs through so many of the songs." DeRogatis agreed, citing the key lyric "I want to go home", which reflects other songs themed around an escape to somewhere peaceful — namely, "Let's Go Away for Awhile" and "Caroline, No".
 

Side two
"God Only Knows"

"God Only Knows" is often praised as one of the greatest songs ever written. Wilson reflected: "I think Tony [Asher] had a musical influence on me somehow. After about ten years, I started thinking about it deeper [...] because I had never written that kind of song. And I remember him talking about 'Stella by Starlight' and he had a certain love for classic songs." The musical structure contains an ambiguous tonal center and non-diatonic chords. According to musicologist Stephen Downes, this quality made the song innovative not just in pop music, but also for the Baroque style it is emulating.

"I Know There's an Answer"
"I Know There's an Answer", originally titled "Hang On to Your Ego", portrays someone who hesitates to tell people the way that they live could be better. The lyrics created a stir within the group due to its references to drug culture. Loren Schwartz, who introduced Wilson to LSD, recounted that Wilson had "had the full-on ego death. It was a beautiful thing." In 1999, Wilson explained that the original chorus line had "an inappropriate lyric. [...] I just thought that to say 'Hang on to your ego' was an ego statement in and of itself, which I wasn't going for, so I changed it. I gave it a lot of thought." The song features a bass harmonica solo played by session musician Tommy Morgan.

"Here Today"

"Here Today" is told from the perspective of an ex-boyfriend narrator who warns the listener of the inevitable heartbreak that will result from a newfound love.  The track was an experiment in basslines, as Brian recalled, "I wanted to conceive the idea of a bass guitar playing an octave higher than regular, and showcase it as the principal instrument on the track." Asher said, "'Here Today' contains a little more of me both lyrically and melodically than Brian." Perone noted that the high-pitched electric bass guitar bring to mind similar parts in "God Only Knows", culminating in what sounds like the vocal protagonist of "Here Today" warning the protagonist of "God Only Knows" that what he sings stands no chance at longevity.

"I Just Wasn't Made for These Times"

"I Just Wasn't Made for These Times" features lyrics about feeling alienated by society. Brian said: "It's about a guy who was crying because he thought he was too advanced, and that he'd eventually have to leave people behind. All my friends thought I was crazy to do Pet Sounds." For the track, he employed harpsichord, tack piano, flutes, temple blocks, timpani, banjo, harmonica, Fender bass, and most unusually, an Electro-Theremin performed by the instrument's inventor Paul Tanner. According to Lambert, the strongest musical indication of Wilson's progressive vision for the album is heard in the cumulative vocal layering in the chorus, with each line sung by Wilson via overdubs.

"Pet Sounds"

"Run, James, Run" was the working title for the instrumental "Pet Sounds", the suggestion being that it would be offered for use in a James Bond movie. According to Perone, the track represents the Beach Boys' surf heritage more than any other track on the album with its emphasis on lead guitar, however, it is not truly a surf composition due to the elaborate arrangement involving countless auxiliary percussion parts, abruptly changing textures, and de-emphasis of a traditional rock band drum set. Lambert describes the track as a "musical synopsis" of the album's "primary musical themes" that functions as a respite for the narrator following the realizations of "Here Today".

"Caroline, No"

"Caroline, No" is about the loss of innocence. Asher conceived the title as "Carol, I Know". When spoken, however, Brian heard this as "Caroline, No", which Asher thought was "a much stronger and more interesting line than the one I had in mind." Brian considered the song "probably the best I've ever written", summarizing, "It's a pretty love song about how this guy and this girl lost it and there's no way to get it back. I just felt sad, so I wrote a sad song." The track is introduced by the sound of a plastic Sparkletts water cooler jug being hit with a hard percussion mallet. As the song fades, it segues into a recorded excerpt of Brian's dogs barking accompanied by a sample of passing trains taken from the 1963 sound effects LP Mister D's Machine.

Leftover material

"The Little Girl I Once Knew"
"The Little Girl I Once Knew", which may be considered part of the Pet Sounds sessions, was not included on the album. Writer Neal Umphred speculated that the song might have been considered for the LP and would have probably been included had the single been more commercially successful.

Instrumentals
On October 15, 1965, Wilson went to the studio with a 43-piece orchestra to record an instrumental piece entitled "Three Blind Mice", which bore no musical connection to the nursery rhyme of the same name. On the same day, he recorded instrumental versions of the standards "How Deep Is the Ocean" and "Stella by Starlight". According to Leaf, it was a coincidence that the latter turned out to be a favorite of Asher's. Biographer Mark Dillon surmised that these recordings were never meant for release, and that they were merely experimental exercises in recording orchestras, possibly in anticipation for the string ensemble required for "Don't Talk".

Another instrumental, "Trombone Dixie", was recorded on November 1. According to Wilson, "I was just foolin' around one day, fuckin' around with the musicians, and I took that arrangement out of my briefcase and we did it in 20 minutes. It was nothing, there was really nothing in it." It was released as a bonus track on the album's 1990 CD reissue.

"Good Vibrations"
In February and March 1966, Wilson began recording an unfinished song he wrote with Asher, "Good Vibrations", between sessions for "I Just Wasn't Made for These Times" and "God Only Knows". Asher recalled that the song was conceived in response to Capitol's demand for a new single. Brian ultimately delivered "Sloop John B" to the label instead, and to the band's disappointment, chose not to include "Good Vibrations" on the album. The track was replaced by "Pet Sounds" as indicated by a Capitol Records memo dated March 3. Johnston and Jardine later expressed regrets with Wilson's decision, as they felt that including "Good Vibrations" would have bolstered the sales of Pet Sounds. However, the song was not completed until many months later, in September, and after much reworking. Wilson's bandmates prevailed against him to include "Good Vibrations" on their next album, Smiley Smile (1967).

Other recordings
In late 1965, Wilson devoted some Pet Sounds sessions to experimental indulgences such as an extended a cappella run-through of the children's song "Row, Row, Row Your Boat" that exploited the song's use of rounds. Granata called the piece "very low-key and relatively simple", but an "effectively lavish layer of recorded vocal harmonies". Humorous skits and sound effects were also recorded in an attempt to create a psychedelic comedy album. At least two sketches survive, "Dick" and "Fuzz", which feature Brian, a woman named Carol, and the Honeys, a girl group that included Marilyn. These recordings remain unreleased.

"Dick" involves an exchange between Brian and Carol: "What's long and thin and full of skin and heaven knows how many holes it's been in?"  "Dick?"  "No, a worm." The participants then burst into forced laughter. According to documentarian Keith Badman, "Just as with his music, Brian insists on perfection for 'Dick' and [six] further takes are made by Carol to tell the joke." "Fuzz" involves a similar joke: "What's black and white and has fuzz inside?" "A lorry?" "A police car." Carol then asks Wilson if he has hemorrhoids: "No." "Well let me shake your hand." "Why?" "It's really great knowing a perfect asshole."

Packaging
Sleeve design

The front sleeve depicts a snapshot of the band – from left, they are Carl, Brian, and Dennis Wilson; Mike Love; and Al Jardine – feeding pieces of apples to seven goats at the San Diego Zoo while dressed in coats and sweaters. A green band header announces the titles of the artist, album, and each track on the LP, all written in the Cooper Black typeface. Bruce Johnston, who joined the band as an unofficial member one year earlier, does not appear on the front cover due to contractual restraints from Columbia Records. On the reverse side, the sleeve contained a montage of monochrome photos depicting the touring band on-stage and posing in samurai outfits during their tour of Japan, as well as two photos of Brian.

Jardine expressed disappointment with the zoo photo and said he had "wanted a more sensitive and enlightening cover." Johnston referred to it as the "worst cover in the history of the record business", while Carlin opined that the backside of the LP was "perhaps an even worse design idea than the goat shot". Author Peter Doggett writes that the design was at odds with the increasingly sophisticated cover portraits used on releases by artists such as the Beatles, the Rolling Stones and Bob Dylan over 1965–67. He highlights it as "a warning of what could happen when music and image parted company: songs of high romanticism, an album cover of stark banality."

Title and cover photo
Writing in his memoir, Love said that Capitol planned the cover shoot after the company had conceived the would-be album title Our Freaky Friends, with the animals representing the group's "freaky friends". When questioned about the cover in 2016, Wilson could not recall who thought of going to the zoo.  Jardine remembered that the Pet Sounds title had already been decided, and that until arriving to the photo shoot, he thought that "pet" referred to slang for making out ("petting"). He credited Capitol's art department with the idea. Some sources claim that Remember the Zoo was another working title, but the name was actually part of a hoax that had originated from a Beach Boys fanzine in the 1990s.

The cover photo was taken on February 10, 1966, by photographer George Jerman. Local reporters from KFMB-TV filmed the shoot. According to a contemporary report by the San Diego Union, the group "came down from Hollywood to take a cover picture for their forthcoming album Our Freaky Friends. [...] Zoo officials were not keen about having their beloved beasts connected with the title of the album, but gave in when the Beach Boys explained that animals are an 'in' thing with teenagers. And that the Beach Boys were rushing to beat the rock and roll group called The Animals." The group was subsequently banned from the zoo, as the staff had accused them of mishandling the animals. Johnston said, "The goats were horrible! [...] The zoo said we were torturing the animals but they should have seen what we had to go through. We were doing all the suffering."

A taped conversation from the March 1966 dog barking session for "Caroline, No" reveals that Brian considered photographing a horse belonging to Carl in Western Studio 3 for the album cover. Wilson told biographer Byron Preiss that the album was named "after the dogs [...] That was the whole idea". Love credited himself with titling the album Pet Sounds, a claim supported by Wilson and Jardine in a 2016 interview. In 1996, Love recalled that he came up with the name while he and his bandmates were standing in the hallway of Western or Columbia studio. He said, "we didn't have a title. [...] We had taken pictures at the zoo and [...] there were animal sounds on the record, and we were thinking, well, it's our favorite music of that time, so I said, 'Why don't we call it Pet Sounds?'" Wilson subsequently consulted Asher, who did not have a favorable reaction to the album's title, thinking that the name had "trivialized what we had accomplished".

In the 1990s, Brian credited Carl with the title. Carl said with uncertainty that the name might have come from Brian: "The idea he [Brian] had was that everybody has these sounds that they love, and this was a collection of his 'pet sounds.' It was hard to think of a name for the album, because you sure couldn't call it Shut Down Vol. 3." Brian commented that the title was a "tribute" to Spector by matching his initials (PS). Wilson's 1991 memoir, Wouldn't It Be Nice: My Own Story, writes that the title was inspired by Love asking "Who's gonna hear this shit? The ears of a dog?" Love denied the veracity of that claim.

Release
Rebranded image

In March 1966, the Beach Boys hired Nick Grillo as their personal manager following a move from Cummins & Currant to Julius Lefkowitz & Company. The band also recruited Derek Taylor, former press officer for the Beatles, as their publicist. According to Carl Wilson, although the band were aware that trends and the music industry were shifting, "Capitol had a very set picture" of the group that remained incongruous with how they wished to present themselves.

For updating the band's image with firsthand accounts of their latest activities, Taylor's prestige was crucial in offering a credible perspective to those outside Wilson's inner circle. Taylor said he was hired to take the band to "a new plateau", and to that end, he invented the tagline "Brian Wilson is a genius".

United States Capitol release

On March 7, the single "Caroline No" (B-side "Summer Means New Love"), was released as Wilson's solo debut, leading to speculation that he was considering leaving the band. The single peaked at number 32 during a seven-week stay. On March 21, "Sloop John B" (B-side "You're So Good to Me") was released as a single, credited to the Beach Boys, and reached number 3.  After Pet Sounds was assembled, Brian brought a complete acetate to Marilyn, who remembered, "It was so beautiful, one of the most spiritual times of my whole life. We both cried. Right after we listened to it, he said he was scared that nobody was going to like it. That it was too intricate." Capitol executives were less impressed and discussed plans to scrap the album when they heard it. Following several meetings – the last of which had Brian appearing with a tape recorder and responding to their questions with eight pre-recorded responses – Capitol accepted the album as the Beach Boys' next LP.

Pet Sounds was released on May 16 and debuted on the Billboard charts at 106. It sold 200,000 copies shortly thereafter. Compared to their previous albums in the US, Pet Sounds achieved somewhat less commercial success, peaking at number 10 on the Billboard LP chart, on July 2, during a ten-month stay. Although total sales were estimated at around 500,000 units, Pet Sounds was not initially awarded gold certification by the Recording Industry Association of America (RIAA) – a first for the group since 1963.

For the album's promotion in the US, Capitol ran full-page advertisements in Billboard that did not distinguish the record from earlier Beach Boys offerings and relied on the group's familiar public image instead of rebranding. This was also true for the promotional spots that were recorded by the Beach Boys themselves and disseminated to radio stations. Like they had done for previous spots, the members performed a comedy skit without any indication of what the record they were promoting sounded like. Instead, they relied on their name recognition. Johnston blamed Capitol for the album's underwhelming sales and alleged that the label did not promote the album as heavily as previous releases. Carl shared this view and said that Capitol did not feel a need to promote the band since they were getting so much airplay. Others assumed that the label considered the album a risk, appealing more to an older demographic than the younger, female audience the Beach Boys built their commercial standing on.

Within two months, Capitol assembled the group's first greatest hits compilation, Best of the Beach Boys, which was quickly certified gold by the RIAA. Capitol A&R director Karl Engemann theorized that because the marketing department "didn't believe that Pet Sounds was going to do that well, they were probably looking for some additional volume in that quarter." There were reports that when record shops ordered copies of Pet Sounds, they instead received Best Of. On July 18, "Wouldn't It Be Nice" (B-side "God Only Knows") was released as a single, peaking at number 8 on September 2. Billboard ultimately ranked the album at number 43 on its "Top Pop Albums of 1966" list.

United Kingdom EMI release

In the UK, the band had little commercial success until March 1966, when "Barbara Ann" and Beach Boys Party! rose to number 2 on the nation's respective Record Retailer charts. In April, two singles were released: "Caroline, No" (no chart showing) and "Sloop John B" (number 2). In response to the band's growing popularity among the British, two music videos were filmed set to "Sloop John B" and "God Only Knows" for the UK's Top of the Pops, both directed by Taylor. The "Sloop John B" video premiered on April 28.

EMI planned to release the record in November to coincide with the band's tour of Britain. From May 16 to 21, Bruce Johnston and Derek Taylor holidayed at central London's Waldorf Hotel with the intention of promoting the album around local music scenes. Thanks to the connections of London-based producer Kim Fowley, a number of musicians, journalists, and other guests (including John Lennon, Paul McCartney and Keith Moon) gathered in their hotel suite to listen to repeated playbacks of the album. Fowley said that they had arranged "a horde of press, so it looked like the Beatles had just arrived at La Guardia airport in 1964. Bruce Johnston was like Jesus Christ in tennis shoes, and Pet Sounds represented the Ten Commandments." Moon himself involved Johnston by helping him gain coverage in British television circuits, and connecting him with Lennon and McCartney.

Due to popular demand, EMI rush-released Pet Sounds on June 27. It peaked at number 2, and remained in the top-ten positions for six months. Taylor is widely recognized as having been instrumental in this success, due to his longstanding connections with the Beatles and other industry figures in the UK. The music press there carried advertisements saying that Pet Sounds was "The Most Progressive Pop Album Ever!" According to Wilson biographer Peter Ames Carlin, Rolling Stones manager Andrew Loog Oldham, who was also the Beach Boys' publisher in England, took out a full-page advertisement in Melody Maker in which he lauded Pet Sounds as "the greatest album ever made". On July 22, "God Only Knows" (B-side "Wouldn't It Be Nice") was released as the third UK single, peaking at number 2.

Pet Sounds was one of the five bestselling UK albums of 1966. In response to the success of the Beach Boys' singles "Barbara Ann", "Sloop John B." and "God Only Knows", EMI flooded the market with other albums by the band, including Party!, Today! and Summer Days. In addition, Best of the Beach Boys was number 2 there for five weeks through to the end of the year. The Beach Boys became the strongest selling album act in the UK for the final quarter of 1966, dethroning the three-year reign of native bands such as the Beatles.

Contemporary reviews
Early reviews for the album in the U.S. ranged from negative to tentatively positive. Billboards terse review, published uncharacteristically late, called it an "exciting, well-produced LP" with "two superb instrumental cuts" and highlighted the "strong single potential" of "Wouldn't It Be Nice". Biographer David Leaf wrote in 1978 that the album received "scattered" instances of praise from American reviewers; the group's fans initially considered Pet Sounds too challenging and "quickly passed the word to 'stay away from the new Beach Boys album, it's weird.'"

By contrast, the reception from music journalists in the UK was highly favorable due in part to the promotional efforts of Taylor, Johnston, and Fowley. Rolling Stone founding editor Jann Wenner later recalled that fans in the UK identified the Beach Boys as being "years ahead" of the Beatles and declared Wilson a "genius"   Penny Valentine of Disc and Music Echo admired Pet Sounds as "Thirteen tracks of Brian Wilson genius ... The whole LP is far more romantic than the usual Beach Boys jollity: sad little wistful songs about lost love and found love and all-around love." Writing in Record Mirror, Norman Jopling reported that the LP had been "widely praised" and subjected to "no criticism". He prefaced his review as "unbiased" and wrote that his only "real complaint" with the album was the "terribly complicated and cluttered" arrangements. Jopling predicted: "It will probably make their present fans like them even more, but it's doubtful whether it will make them any new ones." A reviewer in Disc and Music Echo disagreed: "this should gain them thousands of new fans. Instrumentally ambitious, if vocally over-pretty, Pet Sounds has brilliantly tapped the pulse of the musical times. ... A superb, important and really exciting collection from the group whose recording career so far has been a bit of a hotchpotch."

Melody Maker ran a feature in which many pop musicians were asked whether they believed that the album was truly revolutionary and progressive or "as sickly as peanut butter". The author concluded that "the record's impact on artists and the men behind the artists has been considerable." Among the musicians contributing to the 1966 Melody Maker survey: Spencer Davis of the Spencer Davis Group said: "Brian Wilson is a great record producer. I haven't spent much time listening to the Beach Boys before, but I'm a fan now and I just want to listen to this LP again and again." Then a member of Cream, Eric Clapton reported that everyone in his band loved the album, adding that Wilson was "without doubt a pop genius". Andrew Loog Oldham told the magazine: "I think that Pet Sounds is the most progressive album of the year in as much as Rimsky-Korsakov's Scheherazade was. It's the pop equivalent of that, a complete exercise in pop music."

Three of the nine people who are quoted in the Melody Maker survey (Keith Moon, Manfred Mann's Michael D'Abo, and the Walker Brothers' Scott Walker) did not agree that the album was revolutionary. D'Abo and Walker favored the Beach Boys' earlier work, as did journalist and television presenter Barry Fantoni, who expressed a preference for Beach Boys' Today! and stated that Pet Sounds was "probably revolutionary, but I'm not sure that everything that's revolutionary is necessarily good". Pete Townshend of the Who opined that "the Beach Boys new material is too remote and way out. It's written for a feminine audience."

In other issues of Melody Maker, Mick Jagger stated that he disliked the songs but enjoyed the record and its harmonies, while John Lennon said that Wilson was "doing some very great things". At the end of 1966, the magazine crowned Pet Sounds and the Beatles' Revolver as the joint "Pop Album of the Year". The paper's spokesman wrote, "We argued, argued and argued and still the MM pop panel couldn't agree which was the Pop Album of the Year. The voting was evenly divided [...] Cups of coffee were drunk and sheets of paper were torn up before we finally agreed to compromise and vote for both The Beatles and Beach Boys on top."

Aftermath and spiritual successors

Wilson later said that despite the positive reception afforded to the album in Britain, he felt deeply hurt when Pet Sounds did not sell as highly as he expected and interpreted the poor sales as the public's rejection of his artistry. Marilyn supported that the lackluster response "really destroyed Brian" before adding: "He just lost a lot of faith in people and music. [...] then when people would talk about it later, tell him how great it was, even if it was just a year later, he didn't want to hear about it. It reminded him of failing. And then he was more tortured." Carl remembered Brian's disappointment and said that the album was "so much more than a record [...] it was like going to church and a labor of love."

Tony Asher had a slightly different recollection, "Neither [Brian and I] at the time thought that [Pet Sounds was a masterpiece]. I was more impressed by the production really. To me it was just a great album, and [...] a chance to show some people like my parents, and the guys at the advertising company, that rock music could be [...] a mature medium." Derek Taylor recalled in 1975 that Wilson was unperturbed by the album's poor sales and had been more preoccupied with besting his rivals – namely, the Beatles and the Rolling Stones – on an artistic front.

In mid-1966, Brian began writing songs with lyricist Van Dyke Parks for a new album, Smile, that was never finished but would have included "Good Vibrations". Wilson touted the album as a "teenage symphony to God" that would have surpassed Pet Sounds. During the project's sessions, Wilson revisited the idea of a psychedelic comedy album, previously explored with the "Dick" and "Fuzz" outtakes from Pet Sounds. In October, "Good Vibrations" was issued as a single and became an immediate worldwide hit.

As Wilson's mental health deteriorated, his involvement with the Beach Boys reduced, and the group instead released follow-up records that were less ambitious and largely ignored by critics. Wilson referred to the band's 1968 release Friends as his second "solo album", following Pet Sounds. It was a commercial failure and, in the words of a Mojo writer, caused the band's fanbase to lose "any hope that Brian Wilson would deliver a true successor to [Pet Sounds]".

The 1977 album The Beach Boys Love You saw Wilson's brief reemergence as the group's principal songwriter and singer. Wilson regarded Love You as a spiritual successor to Pet Sounds, namely because of the autobiographical lyrics. In 1988, Wilson released his first solo album, Brian Wilson, which was an attempt to recapture the sensibilities of Pet Sounds, such that co-producer Russ Titelman touted the album as Pet Sounds '88. It included "Baby Let Your Hair Grow Long", a sequel to "Caroline, No".

The Beach Boys, accompanied by Timothy B. Schmit, re-recorded "Caroline, No" with a new multi-part vocal arrangement for the 1996 album Stars and Stripes Vol. 1. Shortly after that album, there were tentative plans for what biographer Mark Dillon nicknamed "Pet Sounds, Vol. 2", an album that would have involved the band teaming with Sean O'Hagan, leader of the avant-pop band the High Llamas. Although many record companies expressed interest in the project, it never progressed past the planning stages. In the late 1990s, Wilson and Asher rekindled their writing partnership and wrote at least four songs together. Only two were released: "This Isn't Love" and "Everything I Need".

Retrospective assessments
Descent into obscurity

Pet Sounds was not nominated for the 1967 Grammy Awards. In his 1969 Pop Chronicles series, John Gilliland stated that the album was almost overshadowed by the Beatles' Revolver, released August 1966, and that "a lot people failed to realize that Brian Wilson's production was as unique in its own way as the Beatles'". In his 1971 reappraisal of the Beach Boys for Melody Maker, Richard Williams wrote that although Pet Sounds had "defied criticism" and "dwarfed all the rest of pop music put together", whatever continued recognition Wilson would have received was immediately diverted to the Beatles' Sgt. Pepper's Lonely Hearts Club Band, released 12 months after Pet Sounds.

Geoffrey Cannon wrote in his late 1967 column for Listener that the group were "lesser than the Beatles" chiefly due to a lack of "emotional range; all their ballads, in evidence especially on Pet Sounds, are juvenile or specious. And none of their albums makes a collective statement." Writing in Jazz & Pop magazine in 1968, Gene Sculatti recognized the album's debt to Rubber Soul, saying that Pet Sounds was "revolutionary only within the confines of the Beach Boys' music", although later in the piece he commented: "Pet Sounds was a final statement of an era and a prophecy that sweeping changes lay ahead."

According to author Johnny Morgan, a "process of reevaluation" of Pet Sounds was underway from the late 1960s onward, with a 1976 NME feature proving especially influential.  Ben Edmonds of Circus wrote in 1971 that the "beauty" of Pet Sounds had aged well against "the turbulence of the past few years", adding that "many consider it not only the Beach Boys' finest achievement, but a milestone in the progression of contemporary rock as well." In a 1972 review for Rolling Stone, Stephen Davis called Pet Sounds "by far" Brian Wilson's best album and said that its "trenchant cycle of love songs has the emotional impact of a shatteringly evocative novel". He argued that the album had changed "the course of popular music" and "a few lives in the bargain". Melody Makers Josh Ingham said in 1973 that the album was "ignored by the public" but inspired many critics to label Wilson a genius, "not least for being a year ahead of Sgt Pepper in thinking." Ingham concluded that, "With hindsight, of course, Pet Sounds has become the classic album."

After 1974, Pet Sounds went out-of-print. In Granata's description, the album subsequently "fell into obscurity" and was "relegated to the cutout bins" for decades. Sociomusicologist Simon Frith wrote in 1981 that Pet Sounds continued to be largely regarded by "the music world" as a "'weird' record". Writing in the first edition of The Rolling Stone Record Guide (1979), Dave Marsh gave the album four stars (out of a possible five) and described it as a "powerful, but spotty" collection on which the least experimental songs proved to be the best. In 1985, he wrote that the album was now considered a "classic", elaborating: "Pet Sounds wasn't a commercial flop, but it did signal that the group was losing contact with its listeners (a charge that could not be leveled against the Beatles during the same period)". Granata offered that, by the time the album reappeared on compact disc in 1990, it was "embraced by hard-core fanatics" yet "still considered an insider's record—a quasi-cult classic".

Ascendance to near-universal acclaim

Pet Sounds has since appeared in many "greatest records of all time" lists and has provoked extensive discourse regarding its musicianship and production. By the 1990s, three British critics' polls had featured the LP at or near the top of their lists. Those who deemed it "the greatest album of all time" included the writing staffs of NME, The Times, and Uncut. In 1994, Pet Sounds was voted number 3 in Colin Larkin's All Time Top 1000 Albums, a book which surveyed the general public alongside hundreds of critics, musicians, record producers, songwriters, radio broadcasters, and music enthusiasts.

In 1998, the National Academy of Recording Arts and Sciences inducted Pet Sounds into the Grammy Hall of Fame. Music journalist Paul Williams, writing in 1998, declared that the record was now universally regarded as a 20th century "classic" comparable to the novel Ulysses, the film 2001: A Space Odyssey, and Picasso's Guernica. Historian Michael Roberts states that "the album's induction into the canon of popular music" had arguably followed the release of its 1997 expanded reissue, The Pet Sounds Sessions. In Music USA: The Rough Guide (1999), Richie Unterberger and Samb Hicks deemed the album a "quantum leap" from the Beach Boys' earlier material, and "the most gorgeous arrangements ever to grace a rock record".

In 2004, Pet Sounds was preserved in the National Recording Registry by the Library of Congress for being "culturally, historically, or aesthetically significant." That year, Pet Sounds overtook Revolver as the top album on Acclaimed Music, a website that statistically aggregates hundreds of published lists. It has maintained this ranking ten-plus years on. By 2006, more than 100 domestic and international publications and journalists had lauded Pet Sounds as one of the greatest albums ever recorded. In Chris Smith's 2009 book 101 Albums That Changed Popular Music, Pet Sounds is evaluated as "one of the most innovative recordings in rock" and as the work that "elevated Brian Wilson from talented bandleader to studio genius".

Music historian Luis Sanchez viewed the album as "the score to a film about what rock music doesn't have to be. For all of its inward-looking sentimentalism, it lays out in a masterful way the kind of glow and sui generis vision that Brian aimed to expand in a radical way with Smile." Music critic Tim Sommer, referencing other albums that are often labeled "masterpieces", such as Thick as a Brick (1972), Dark Side of the Moon (1973), and OK Computer (1997), commented that "only Pet Sounds is written from the teen or adolescent point of view." It has been viewed by some writers as the best pop rock album of all time, including Sommer, who deemed it "the greatest album of all time, probably by about 20 or 30 lengths".

Totemic status

In 2000, Pitchfork founder Ryan Schreiber gave Pet Sounds then-latest reissue a 7.5 (out of 10) and decreed that while Pet Sounds had been "groundbreaking enough to permanantly  alter the course of music", its "straight-forward pop music" had become "passe and cliched", especially when compared to Pink Floyd's The Dark Side of the Moon, My Bloody Valentine's Loveless, and Radiohead's OK Computer.  For the album's 40th Anniversary edition, Pitchfork ran another review, this time written by Dominique Leone, who awarded the album a 9.4 score. Leone opined that the work had aged well and deserved its continued praise, although he preferred the band's post-Pet Sounds recordings. He wrote:

Music journalist Robert Christgau, writing in 2004, felt that Pet Sounds was a good record, but believed it had become looked upon as a totem. In the 2004 book Kill Your Idols, which reevaluates so-called "classic" rock albums, Jeff Nordstedt writes that the commentary surrounding Pet Sounds had "rarely" discussed specifics about the album, only its impact and influence. He wrote "The fact is, even the hits are disjointed, and the rest of the songs are downright insane." Nordstedt lamented the negative aspects of its influence – namely, the "overproduction" exemplified in the music of the 1980s – as well as the record's inoffensive aesthetics, the lack of "visceral charge", and the fact that it had been co-written by a jingle writer ("it offends every notion of truth that I hold dear about rock 'n' roll").

Musician Atticus Ross, who composed the soundtrack to the 2014 Brian Wilson biopic, referred to "an element of cliché that's grown around" the album, exemplified in a comedy sketch from the television show Portlandia in which "your classic hipster musicians [...] are building a studio and everything is like 'this is the mike they used in Pet Sounds.' This is exactly the same as Pet Sounds.'" In 2016, commentator C.W. Maloney described the continued fascination as "the victory of boring poptimism", adding that "The songs on Pet Sounds are great, but you have to wonder, given all the hype and mythology and our love of shallow nostalgia, what we mean when we call it a classic or Wilson a genius. Consider what [Frank] Zappa was doing in 1966, to say nothing of Miles [Davis]."

Wilson himself was bemused by the album's continued acclaim. In a 2002 documentary about the album, he commented, "It keeps going back to Pet Sounds here in my life, and I'm going, 'What about this Pet Sounds? Is it really that good an album?' It's stood the test of time, of course, but is it really that great an album to listen to? I don't know."

Influence and legacy
Innovations

Pet Sounds is recognized as an ambitious and sophisticated work that advanced the field of music production in addition to setting a higher standard in music composition and numerous precedents in its recording. Philip Lambert, a professor of music at the CUNY Graduate Center in New York, wrote that the album was "an extraordinary achievement – for any musician, but especially for the 23-year-old Wilson". Singer-songwriter Jimmy Webb described it as "a musician's album", "an engineer's album", and "a songwriter's album". Paul McCartney declared that "no one is educated musically 'til they've heard that album." To explain why the album "was one of the defining moments of its time", composer Philip Glass referred to "its willingness to abandon formula in favor of structural innovation, the introduction of classical elements in the arrangements, [and] production concepts in terms of overall sound which were novel at the time". Edmonds believed that the album's "most impressive" feature was "the fully integrated use of orchestration, an area glossed over all too lightly in those days."

Although not originally a big seller, Pet Sounds was "enormously" influential from the moment of its release. No other artist of Wilson's stature had written, arranged, and produced an album on the scale of Pet Sounds, and Granata writes that Wilson's "authoritative approach affected his contemporaries" and thus "redefined" the role of the producer. Producer Lenny Waronker, who later became president of Warner Bros. Records, supported that Pet Sounds likely contributed to a higher emphasis on studio artistry among West Coast artists. "Creative record-making took a giant step and it affected everybody who was caught up in it. It was a landmark record". Similarly in Britain, many groups responded to the album by increasing the studio experimentation on their records. In 1971, publication Beat Instrumental & International Recording wrote: "Pet Sounds took everyone by surprise. In terms of musical conception, lyric content, production and performance, it stood as a landmark in a music genre whose development was about to begin snowballing."

In rock music, Pet Sounds marked the first occasion in which doubling was used for virtually every instrument, a technique previously limited to classical composers and orchestrators. It was also the first time that a group departed from the usual small-ensemble electric rock band format for an entire album. "I Just Wasn't Made for These Times" was the first piece in popular music to incorporate the Electro-Theremin as well as the first in rock music to feature a theremin-like instrument. According to D. Strauss, the Beach Boys were also the first major rock group to openly challenge contemporary music trends "and declare that rock really didn't matter." Cue magazine reflected in 1971 that Pet Sounds made "the Beach Boys among the vanguard" and anticipated trends that were not widespread in rock music "until 1969–1970". The album is also frequently credited for being "partially responsible for the invention of synthesizers", according to Norstedt, who explains that the doubled and tripled instrumental parts "fueled the drive toward the synthesizer—a single electronic instrument which fuses the tones of multiple organic instruments to create an entirely new sound. Wilson maniacally synthesized sounds on Pet Sounds before such a device was available."

Cultural historian John Robert Greene stated that "God Only Knows" remade the ideal of the popular love song, while "Sloop John B" and "Pet Sounds" broke new ground and took rock music away from its casual lyrics and melodic structures into what was then uncharted territory. He also credited Pet Sounds (as well as Rubber Soul, Revolver, and the 1960s folk movement) with spawning the majority of trends in post-1965 rock music. Many Los Angeles record producers imitated the album's orchestral style, which became a component to the sunshine pop acts that followed. Discussing the smooth soul genre, Chicago Reader Noah Berlatsky argued that the Beach Boys helped bridge a gap between the polished pop harmonizing of the Drifters and the experimentation of the Chi-Lites, particularly with "Sloop John B", whose "fussy" arrangements, "pure" harmonies, and "childish vulnerability" he says "come out of a tradition of pop R&B". "Wouldn't It Be Nice" was similarly influential to power pop with respect to its "happy"-sounding music underpinned by a sense of yearning and longing.

Pet Sounds is often cited as one of the earliest entries in the canon of psychedelic rock. Scholar Philip Auslander writes that even though psychedelic music is not normally associated with the Beach Boys, the "odd directions" and experiments in Pet Sounds "put it all on the map. [...] basically that sort of opened the door—not for groups to be formed or to start to make music, but certainly to become as visible as say Jefferson Airplane or somebody like that." DeRogatis said that it was one of the first psychedelic rock masterpieces, along with The Psychedelic Sounds of the 13th Floor Elevators (1966) and Revolver.

Recognition of progressive and art rock

Pet Sounds marked the origins of progressive pop, a genre that gave way to progressive rock. Tidal contributor Ryan Breed cited the album's "non-rock instrumentation (strings, brass, Theremin, harpsichord, tack piano), dizzying key changes and complex vocal harmonies" as features that informed progressive pop. Journalist Troy Smith similarly cited "Wouldn't It Be Nice" as "the first taste of progressive pop" subsequently elaborated upon by bands such as the Beatles, Queen, and Supertramp.

The album also furthered the "rock as art" concept heralded by Rubber Soul. In the belief of music journalist Barney Hoskyns, "If the Beatles' Rubber Soul was the first album to make a case for pop music as a maturing art form, 1966's Pet Sounds was a quantum leap into the unknown". According to Gary Graff, Pet Sounds "can be seen as a launch pad for the album era", alongside Bob Dylan's Highway 61 Revisited (1965) and Blonde on Blonde (1966).

Composer and journalist Frank Oteri recognized Pet Sounds as a "clear precedent" to the birth of album-oriented rock and progressive rock. Bill Martin, an author of books about prog-rock, felt that the album represented a turning point for prog as the Beach Boys and the Beatles transformed rock music from dance music into music that was made for listening to, bringing "expansions in harmony, instrumentation (and therefore timbre), duration, rhythm, and the use of recording technology". Asked in a 1968 interview about the Beatles' role in rock's "progress toward an art form", Led Zeppelin founder Jimmy Page responded, "I think the Beach Boys tried to do it first. I think there were lots of Beach Boy things on the Revolver album. Especially, the vocal harmony. Wilson really said a lot in his Pet Sounds album." Gang of Four's Andy Gill argued that "so many rock bands took [Pet Sounds] as a green light to get clever—to start playing with the time signatures, to go prog. You know, 'Let's put a french horn in there!' Before you know it, you've got Queen."

In the wake of Pet Sounds, Wilson was heralded as the leading figure of the "art-rock" movement. Pet Sounds is viewed as the first work of art rock by Leaf, Jones, and Frith. Rolling Stone writers described the album as heralding the art rock of the 1970s. Sommer writes that "Pet Sounds proved that a pop group could make an album-length piece comparable with the greatest long-form works of Bernstein, Copland, Ives, and Rodgers and Hammerstein." Bill Holdship said that it was "perhaps rock's first example of self-conscious art". According to Jim Fusilli, author of the 33⅓ book on the album, it raised itself to "the level of art through its musical sophistication and the precision of its statement", while academic Michael Johnson said that the album was one of the first documented moments of ascension in rock music. In 2010, Pet Sounds was listed in Classic Rock's "50 Albums That Built Prog Rock".

Connections to contemporary works

Discussions of the greatest albums of all time frequently mention Pet Sounds with the Beatles' Revolver and Bob Dylan's Blonde on Blonde, which were all released within four months of each other. Journalist Liel Leibovitz called Pet Sounds and Blonde on Blonde "two strands in the same conversation, the one that turned American popular music, for one fleeting moment of one year in the middle 1960s, into a religious movement". Author Geoffrey Himes said that "Brian's introduction of non-standard harmonies and timbres proved as revolutionary" as Dylan's introduction of "irony into rock'n'roll lyrics".

Rock historians also frequently link Pet Sounds to the Beatles' Sgt. Pepper's Lonely Hearts Club Band. Paul McCartney later credited Pet Sounds as an influence on his increasingly melodic bass-playing style and cited "God Only Knows" as "the greatest song ever written". He said that the album was the primary impetus for Sgt. Pepper and influenced his Revolver composition "Here, There and Everywhere". Dennis Wilson said, "Pet Sounds had a lot to do with Sgt. Pepper. I remember talking to Paul McCartney and a couple guys and they were saying, 'Sorry we ripped you off.'"

Among the distinguishing musical features of Pet Sounds that the Beatles adopted throughout Sgt. Pepper were the upper-register bass lines, a larger emphasis on floor toms, and more eclectic and unorthodox combinations of instruments (including bass harmonica). Lambert writes that "the overall key relations" on Pet Sounds resemble the patterns found on Sgt. Pepper, particularly with the invocation of B as a tonic.

Alternative music
During the 1990s, Pet Sounds was influential to indie pop musicians as Wilson became "godfather" to an era of indie musicians who were inspired by his melodic sensibilities, studio experimentation, and chamber pop orchestrations. Chamber pop itself became a genre that was based on the musical template of Pet Sounds. In the mid-1990s, Robert Schneider of the Apples in Stereo and Jim McIntyre of Von Hemmling founded Pet Sounds Studio, which served as the venue for many Elephant 6 projects such as Neutral Milk Hotel's In the Aeroplane Over the Sea, and the Olivia Tremor Control's Dusk at Cubist Castle and Black Foliage.

The album's influence on emo music, according to writer Sean Cureton, is evident on Weezer's Pinkerton (1996) and Death Cab for Cutie's Transatlanticism (2003). Treblezines Ernest Simpson and Wild Nothing's Jack Tatum additionally characterize Pet Sounds as the first emo album.

Continued impact
In the decades since its release, Pet Sounds has influenced artists from a wide span of genres, including rock, pop, hip hop, jazz, electronic, experimental, and punk. Wilson also originated the trope of the "reclusive genius" among studio-oriented musical artists. Jason Guriel of The Atlantic, writing about the record in 2016, drew comparisons with the albums of Michael Jackson, Prince, and Radiohead, and said that Wilson "certainly anticipated the modern pop-centric era, which privileges producer over artist and blurs the line between entertainment and art". In 1995, a panel of musicians, songwriters and producers, surveyed by Mojo, ranked Pet Sounds as the "greatest record" of all time. Referencing the album's newfound popularity in 1998, journalist Paul Lester reported that "today's most interesting acts – The High Llamas, Air, Kid Loco, Saint Etienne, Stereolab, Lewis Taylor – are using the Brian Wilson songbook as a resource for their forays into the realms of electronic pop." Cornelius' 1997 release Fantasma was created as an explicit homage to Pet Sounds and contains numerous references to the album.

Tribute albums include Do It Again: A Tribute to Pet Sounds (2005), The String Quartet Tribute to the Beach Boys' Pet Sounds (2006), MOJO Presents Pet Sounds Revisited (2012), and A Tribute to Pet Sounds (2016). In 2007, producer Bullion created a J Dilla mashup of the album, Pet Sounds in the Key of Dee. Hip-hop producer Questlove recalled that for "black teenagers coming of age in the 1980s", the Beach Boys were out of fashion, and that in the late 1990s, he was ridiculed by "J Dilla, Common, Proof, and a whole bunch of east-side Detroit cats" for enjoying Pet Sounds. Later, "Dilla was like, 'Yeah, you're right man, they had some shit on there.'"

In 1990, the political cartoon strip Doonesbury ran a controversial story arc involving the character Andy Lippincott and his terminal battle with AIDS. It concludes with Lippincott expressing his admiration for Pet Sounds, and in the last panels, depicts the character's death while listening to "Wouldn't It Be Nice", as well as his last written words, the line "Brian Wilson is God" scrawled on a notebook (a wry reference to the line "Clapton is God"). According to cultural theorist Kirk Curnett in 2012, the panel "remains one of the most iconic in Doonesburys forty-three year history, often credit[ed] with helping humanize AIDS victims when both gay and straight sufferers were severely stigmatized."

In 2000, the album was presented with gold and platinum awards based on sales that could be documented, although Capitol estimated it may have sold over two million copies. By 2007, there had been at least three books dedicated to Pet Sounds. In Japan, Jim Fusilli's book was translated to Japanese by the novelist Haruki Murakami. Writing in his 2012 book Music Producer: for Producers, Composers, Arrangers, and Students, Michael Zager stated that the album's production techniques remained in use forty-six years later. The album motivated film producer Bill Pohlad to direct the 2014 biopic on Brian Wilson, Love & Mercy, a film which includes a substantial depiction of the album's making, with actor Paul Dano portraying Wilson.

In 2016, to honor the album's 50th anniversary, 26 artists contributed to a Pitchfork retrospective on its influence, which included comments from members of Talking Heads, Yo La Tengo, Chairlift, and Deftones. The editor noted that the "wide swath of artists assembled for this feature represent but a modicum of the album's vast measure of influence. Its scope transcends just about all lines of age, race, and gender. Its impact continues to broaden with each passing generation."

Live performances

After its release, several selections from Pet Sounds became staples for the group's live performances, including "Wouldn't It Be Nice", "Sloop John B" and "God Only Knows". Other songs were performed, albeit sporadically and infrequently through the years, and the album was never performed in its entirety with every original group member. In the late 1990s, Carl Wilson vetoed an offer for the Beach Boys to perform Pet Sounds in full for ten shows, reasoning that the studio arrangements were too complex for the stage, and that Brian could not possibly sing his original parts.

As a solo artist, Brian performed the entire album live in 2000 with a different orchestra in each venue, and on three occasions without orchestra on his 2002 tour. The concerts received favorable reviews, however, critics focused on Wilson's "trancelike" demeanor and odd interview responses. Recordings from Wilson's 2002 concert tour were released as Brian Wilson Presents Pet Sounds Live. Rolling Stones Dorian Lynskey says that the shows helped establish the now-ubiquitous practice of artists playing "classic albums" in their entirety.

In 2013, Wilson performed the album at two shows, unannounced, also with Jardine as well as original Beach Boys guitarist David Marks. In 2016, Wilson performed the album at several events in Australia, Japan, Europe, Canada and the United States. The tour was planned as his final performances of the album, but occasional shows were performed through 2020. A concert reviewer noted that Wilson received a standing ovation every time he performed a track from the album.

Reissues and expanded editions

Pet Sounds has had many different reissues since its release in 1966, including remastered mono and remixed stereo versions.
 In 1966, Capitol issued a Duophonic (fake stereo) version of the album that was created through equalization and phasing.
 In 1968, Capitol issued Pet Sounds as part of a three-LP set with Today! and Summer Days.
 In 1972, Reprise packaged Pet Sounds as a bonus LP with the Beach Boys' latest album Carl and the Passions – "So Tough".
 In 1974, Reprise issued Pet Sounds as a single disc, which became the album's last reissue until 1990.
 In 1990, Pet Sounds debuted on CD with the addition of three previously unreleased bonus tracks: "Unreleased Backgrounds" (an a cappella demo section of "Don't Talk" sung by Wilson), "Hang On to Your Ego", and "Trombone Dixie".  The edition was prepared from the original 1966 mono master, by Mark Linett, who used Sonic Solutions' No Noise processing to mitigate damage that the physical master had accrued. It became one of the first CDs to sell more than a million copies.
 In 1995, DCC issued a 20-bit audiophile version that was mastered by engineer Steve Hoffman. It was created from a safety copy of the original master. According to Granata, this version "garnered numerous accolades, and some feel it comes closest to capturing the spirit and punch of Brian's original 1966 mix."
 In 1997, The Pet Sounds Sessions was released as a four-disc box set. It included the original mono release of Pet Sounds, the album's first stereo mix (created by Linett and Wilson), backing tracks, isolated vocals, and session highlights. It was received with controversy among audiophiles who felt that a stereo mix of Pet Sounds was sacrilege against the original mono recording.
 In 2001, Pet Sounds was issued with mono and "improved" stereo versions, plus "Hang On to Your Ego" as a bonus track, all on one disc.
 On August 29, 2006, Capitol released a 40th Anniversary edition, containing a new 2006 remaster of the original mono mix, DVD mixes (stereo and Surround Sound), and a "making of" documentary. The discs were released in a regular jewel box and a deluxe edition was released in a green fuzzy box. A two-disc colored gatefold vinyl set was released with green (stereo) and yellow (mono) discs.
 In 2016, a 50th anniversary edition box set presented the remastered album in both stereo and mono forms alongside studio sessions outtakes, alternate mixes, and live recordings. Of the 104 tracks, only 14 were previously unreleased.

Track listingNotes Mike Love was not originally credited for "Wouldn't It Be Nice" and "I Know There's an Answer". His credits were awarded after a 1994 court case.
 Al Jardine's contribution to the arrangement of "Sloop John B" remains uncredited.
 Vocal credits sourced from Alan Boyd and Craig Slowinski.

Personnel
Per band archivist Craig Slowinski.The Beach Boys Al Jardine – vocals
 Bruce Johnston – vocals
 Mike Love – vocals
 Brian Wilson – vocals; plucked piano strings on "You Still Believe in Me"; bass guitar, Danelectro bass, and organ on "That's Not Me"; piano on "Pet Sounds"; overdubbed organ or harmonium on "I Know There's an Answer"
 Carl Wilson – vocals; lead guitar and overdubbed 12-string electric guitar on "That's Not Me"; 12-string electric guitar on "God Only Knows"
 Dennis Wilson – vocals; drums on "That's Not Me"Guests Tony Asher – plucked piano strings on "You Still Believe in Me"
 Steve Korthof – tambourine on "That's Not Me"
 Terry Melcher – tambourine on "That's Not Me" and "God Only Knows"
 Marilyn Wilson – additional vocals on "You Still Believe in Me" introduction (uncertain)
 Tony (surname unknown) – tambourine on "Sloop John B"Session musicians (also known as "the Wrecking Crew")

 Chuck Berghofer – string bass
 Hal Blaine – bicycle horn, drums, percussion, sleigh bells, timpani
 Glen Campbell – banjo, guitar
 Frank Capp – bells, beverage cup, timpani, glockenspiel, tambourine, temple blocks, vibraphone
 Al Casey – guitar
 Roy Caton – trumpet
 Jerry Cole – electric guitar, guitar
 Gary Coleman – bongos, timpani
 Mike Deasy – guitar
 Al De Lory – harpsichord, organ, piano, tack piano
 Steve Douglas – alto saxophone, clarinet, flute, piano, temple blocks, tenor saxophone
 Carl Fortina – accordion
 Ritchie Frost – drums, bongos, Coca-Cola cans
 Jim Gordon – drums, orange juice cups
 Bill Green – alto saxophone, clarinet, flute, güiro, tambourine
 Leonard Hartman – bass clarinet, clarinet, English horn
 Jim Horn – alto saxophone, clarinet, baritone saxophone, flute
 Paul Horn – flute
 Jules Jacob – flute
 Plas Johnson – clarinet, güiro, flute, piccolo, tambourine, tenor saxophone
 Carol Kaye – electric bass, guitar
 Barney Kessel – guitar
 Bobby Klein – clarinet
 Larry Knechtel – harpsichord, organ, tack piano
 Frank Marocco – accordion
 Gail Martin – bass trombone
 Nick Martinis – drums
 Mike Melvoin – harpsichord
 Jay Migliori – baritone saxophone, bass clarinet, bass saxophone, clarinet, flute
 Tommy Morgan – bass harmonica
 Jack Nimitz – baritone saxophone, bass saxophone
 Bill Pitman – guitar
 Ray Pohlman – electric bass
 Don Randi – tack piano
 Alan Robinson – french horn
 Lyle Ritz – string bass, ukulele
 Billy Strange – electric guitar, guitar, 12-string electric guitar
 Ernie Tack – bass trombone
 Paul Tanner – Electro-Theremin
 Tommy Tedesco – acoustic guitar
 Jerry Williams – timpani
 Julius Wechter – bicycle bell, tambourine, timpani, vibraphoneThe Sid Sharp Strings Arnold Belnick – violin
 Norman Botnick – viola
 Joseph DiFiore – viola
 Justin DiTullio – cello
 Jesse Erlich – cello
 James Getzoff – violin
 Harry Hyams – viola
 William Kurasch – violin
 Leonard Malarsky – violin
 Jerome Reisler – violin
 Joseph Saxon – cello
 Ralph Schaeffer – violin
 Sid Sharp – violin
 Darrel Terwilliger – viola
 Tibor Zelig – violinEngineers'''
 Bruce Botnick
 Chuck Britz
 H. Bowen David
 Larry Levine
 Other engineers may have included Jerry Hochman, Phil Kaye, Jim Lockert, and Ralph Valentine.

Charts and certifications

Awards and Accolades

Notes

References

Bibliography

External links
 
 
 

1966 albums
Albums arranged by Brian Wilson
Albums conducted by Brian Wilson
Albums produced by Brian Wilson
Albums recorded at Gold Star Studios
Albums recorded at Sunset Sound Recorders
Albums recorded at United Western Recorders
Art rock albums by American artists
Avant-pop albums
Baroque pop albums
The Beach Boys albums
Capitol Records albums
Chamber pop albums
Concept albums
Experimental pop albums
Experimental rock albums by American artists
Grammy Hall of Fame Award recipients
Progressive pop albums
Psychedelic pop albums
Psychedelic rock albums by American artists
United States National Recording Registry recordings
United States National Recording Registry albums